←2005 - 2006 - 2007→

This is a list of Japanese television dramas often called doramas by fans.

2006 Winter Season
Series

2006 Spring Season
Series

2006 Summer Season
Series

2006 Fall Season
Series

See also
 List of Japanese television dramas

 List of Japanese Television Dramas
Dramas, 2006